Eduardo P. Argon (born 1929) is a former Uruguayan tennis player. He reached Wimbledon's second round in men's single twice, in 1954 and 1957. He also reached the third round in Wimbledon men's double twice, in 1954, 1958.

Argon won the 1954 Tournament of Menton in March of that year, defeating Aleco Noghes in the final. He continued playing tennis also after retirement, well into his 80s.

Career finals

Singles

References

External links
 

Uruguayan male tennis players
1929 births
Living people